Anachastis is a genus of moths of the family Xyloryctidae from the Seychelles. It contains only one species, Anachastis digitata.

The wingspan is about 21 mm. The forewings are pale greyish-ochreous irregularly tinged with crimson-pink, with scattered brown and blackish scales. The second discal stigma is dark grey and there is a reddish-fuscous outwardly oblique streak from the dorsum before the middle, not reaching the fold, and a similar inwardly oblique streak from the tornus. The hindwings are light grey.

See also
 List of moths of Seychelles

References

Meyrick, E. 1911d. Tortricina and Tineina. Results of the Percy Sladen Trust Expedition to the Indian Ocean in 1905. - Transactions of the Linnean Society of London (2)14(3):263–307.

Xyloryctidae
Monotypic moth genera
Taxa named by Edward Meyrick
Moths of Africa
Xyloryctidae genera